Sir William Henry Wilkinson (traditional Chinese: 務謹順, simplified Chinese: 务谨顺; May 10, 1858 - 1930) was a British Sinologist who served as Consul-General for the United Kingdom in China and Korea. He was also a playing card collector and card game enthusiast.

British Diplomatic Service

Books
Where Chineses Drive: English Student-Life at Peking (London, 1885)
"Those Foreign Devils!": A Celestial on England and Englishmen by Hsiang-fu Yuan (translated by Wilkinson; London and New York, 1891)
The Game of Khanhoo (London, 1891)
A Manual of Chinese Chess (Shanghai, 1893)
Chinese Origin of Playing Cards (1895)
The Corean government: constitutional changes, July 1894 to October 1895. With an appendix on subsequent enactments to 30th June 1896 (1896)
Bridge Maxims (1918)
Mah-Jongg: a memorandum (1925)

His Collection of Playing Cards
Cards from Wilkinson's collection are now in the British Museum, and are referred to in Catalogue of the collection of playing cards bequeathed to the Trustees of  the British museum by the late Lady [[Charlotte Schreiber]] by British Museum] by Freeman M. O'Donoghue (1901),  pp. 184–185: "Chinese - Collection of modern packs acquired by the testator from  Mr. W.H. Wilkinson of H.M. Consular Service, who has kindly furnished the  following information: 'The packs contained in this collection were procured during  the year 1889-90 from Canton, Swatow, and Foochow in South China, from Ningbo and Shanghai on the central sea-board,  from Peking in the north, from Kiukiang and Yichang in mid- China, and from Chungking in the far west....''"

References

External links
Elliot Avedon Virtual Museum of Games: W.H. Wilkinson. University of Waterloo

1858 births
1930 deaths
British diplomats
19th-century English people
British sinologists
Tabletop game writers
Chess historians